Palmerston North Airport , originally called Milson Aerodrome, is an airport in the Manawatū-Whanganui region of New Zealand, serving Palmerston North City and the Central North Island regions. It is located in the suburb of Milson, on the outskirts of Palmerston North, New Zealand, approximately 5.5 km (3.4ml) NE from the central business district of Palmerston North City. The airport is 100% owned by the Palmerston North City Council and covers an area of 208ha. The airport is New Zealand's 8th busiest and handled a total of 515,727 passengers in the 2016 financial year. The airport handles around 30 commercial passenger flights per day to and from Auckland, Christchurch, Hamilton, Napier, Nelson as well as cargo flights on week nights between Auckland and Christchurch.

The airport operates two runways, a sealed 1902m runway and a parallel grass 608m runway, which is utilised for general aviation and training activities by Massey University's School of Aviation, Helipro and Eagle Aviation. Operating 24/7 with no curfews imposed, the airport has become a freight hub for Parcelair.

Common aircraft operating in Palmerston North Airport are ATR72, Bombardier Q300, Boeing 737-400F and Jetstream 31. Diamond DA40 and DA42 training aircraft used by Massey University's School of Aviation are also commonly seen in the airport. In addition to the normal aircraft types, the airport is able to cater for Airbus A320 aircraft. The airport accommodates charters including business jets through to the larger Airbus A320 aircraft. The airport receives some diverted flights from Wellington due to adverse weather conditions there. The airport has an excellent operational preference, opening majority of the time.

History
The first airfield on this site was created by the Milson Aerodrome Society in 1931, comprising a grass runway. It was used exclusively for private flights. The first commercial flights began in 1936, operated by Union Airways. During World War II the airport was also used as a military facility. When the National Airways Corporation commenced service to the airport in the 1950s the runway was sealed and a terminal building was constructed; jets started to serve the airport domestically operated by Air New Zealand in 1975, beginning with Boeing 737-200s.

A new terminal was constructed in 1992 and a new taxiway was built in 1994. Following the major upgrades of the airport, Freedom Air started regular international flights to Brisbane and Sydney in 1996. Other destinations including Gold Coast, Melbourne and Nadi were added in 1999.

A Royal Brunei Airlines Boeing 767-200 landed at the airport on 10 March 2003 due to diversion, making it the first and only 767 to land at the airport. Since Freedom Air ceased operations in 2008 and Oz jet pulling out of a contract before any flights began, no carrier has served the airport with scheduled international flights.

In 2014, the airport released its Master plan for 2014–2035. Some proposed ideas include further lengthening the runway, a new taxiway parallel to the runway and an Instrument landing system.

In 2016 due to an increase in need for overnight mail, Freightways upgraded their New Zealand domestic freight fleet from the ageing Convair 580s and 5800s to the bigger and faster Boeing 737-400Fs under the new company name of Parcelair.

In 2018 Palmerston North Airport contracted Higgins to start constructing taxiway Charlie.

World record 
On 17 May 1998, ten people towed a fully fuelled Freedom Air Boeing 737-300 over 100 metres in 47 seconds, to celebrate the opening of the new runway extensions. The record was logged in the Guinness World Records.

Airlines and destinations

Passenger

Cargo

Statistics

Incidents
On 9 June 1995, Ansett New Zealand Flight 703, a de Havilland Canada Dash 8 crashed into the Tararua Ranges, 16 km east of the airport, killing four out of the 21 people on board. The aircraft was on a VOR approach into runway 25 when the right main landing gear failed to lower, and the aircraft was allowed to descend below profile towards the ranges while the pilots were attempting the alternate gear extension procedure.

See also

 List of airports in New Zealand
 List of airlines of New Zealand
 Transport in New Zealand
 List of busiest airports in New Zealand

References

External links
 Airport official site

Airports in New Zealand
Buildings and structures in Palmerston North
Transport buildings and structures in Manawatū-Whanganui